Evan Rosen is an American author, speaker, business strategist, blogger, and journalist. He is Executive Director of The Culture of Collaboration Institute and Chief Strategist of Impact Video Communication, Inc., which he co-founded.

Rosen is the author of The Culture of Collaboration series of books. The first book in the series is The Culture of Collaboration, a Gold Medal Winner in the Axiom Business Book Awards. The second book in the series is The Bounty Effect: 7 Steps to The Culture of Collaboration. The Bounty Effect includes a back-cover endorsement from Steve Wozniak, co-founder of Apple.

Work

The Culture of Collaboration shows how collaboration creates business value and demonstrates how collaborative culture is changing business models and the nature of work. Terms Rosen coins in the book include mirror zones, which are time zones that are opposite or nearly opposite, and the Ten Cultural Elements of Collaboration.   Companies used as examples in the book include Boeing, Toyota, The Dow Chemical Company, Procter & Gamble, BMW, Mayo Clinic, Myelin Repair Foundation, Industrial Light & Magic and DreamWorks Animation. According to a review by the Axiom Business Book Awards, “Whether it is dealing with the changing trends of business or the basic cultural elements that enable collaboration, Rosen is able to offer insight on every situation.” According to a profile of Rosen in the MIT Technology Review, “American society, says Rosen, encourages individualism and a star system, which inhibits the very collaboration that he maintains can make companies more effective.”

The Bounty Effect: 7 Steps to The Culture of Collaboration provides a framework for replacing obsolete Industrial Age organizational structures based on command-and-control with collaborative organizational structures designed for the Information Age.   The book gets its name from the mutiny that occurred on the H.M.S. Bounty in 1789. Rosen uses the mutiny to illustrate how exigent circumstances compel companies, governments and organizations to change their structures from command-and-control to collaborative. According to a review in Publishers Weekly:  “In his book, Rosen, an internationally recognized collaboration and communication strategist, presents seven steps to establishing a collaborative culture within an organization, moving away from the Industrial Age mentality to one better suited for the Information Age.”

Rosen is also the author of Personal Videoconferencing (Manning/Prentice Hall, 1996), the first book on PC-based videoconferencing. In the book, he coined the word collabicate, which means to collaborate and communicate.

Biography

Rosen delivers keynote speeches globally at corporate and government events such as the National Conference on Clinical Research in Gothenburg, Sweden and the Tagetik User Conference in Lucca, Italy. He has also lectured at the Brookings Institution and the Stanford University Center for Professional Development.  On the sixth anniversary of the 9/11 terrorist attacks, Rosen delivered a speech on how to adopt cross-agency collaborative culture and processes to the United States Intelligence Community at the Office of the Director of National Intelligence (ODNI). 

Rosen’s work has been featured in The Wall Street Journal, Investor's Business Daily, Bloomberg BusinessWeek, Forbes, The Washington Post, MIT Technology Review, CIO Magazine, IndustryWeek, NetworkWorld, InformationWeek, Workforce, The Washington Times, Executive Travel, Talent Management, Computerworld Canada, Leader to Leader, CableWorld, Communication World, Sales and Marketing Management, InfoWorld Netherlands, TechWorld United Kingdom, Exame Magazine of Brazil,   and he has appeared on CNN, CBS News, CNBC's "Collaboration Now" primetime special and on numerous local television and radio broadcasts. Rosen's "Collaboration" columns have appeared on Bloomberg BusinessWeek.com  He also writes The Culture of Collaboration® blog.

Rosen spent his early career reporting on Silicon Valley and the automobile industry for television stations. He has held news positions at KICU-TV in San Jose, WTOL-TV in Toledo, WABC-TV in New York, WXYZ-TV in Detroit, KODE-TV in Joplin, Missouri, and WCBN-FM in Ann Arbor.

He holds a B.A. in history from the University of Michigan -Ann Arbor where he was news director and a member of the board of directors of the Campus Broadcasting Network. He is also a graduate of Horace Mann School in New York City where he was executive editor of The Record.

References

External links
Profile of Evan Rosen in MIT Technology Review by Lee Gomes 
Avaya Innovations Magazine by Eric Lai
Talent Management magazine. "Can Collaboration Be Forced?" by Kellye Whitney.
Federal News Radio. "How to Bust Silos and Foster Collaboration." by Dorothy Ramienski. 
Library Journal review of The Bounty Effect: 7 Steps to The Culture of Collaboration
Publishers Weekly review of The Bounty Effect: 7 Steps to The Culture of Collaboration
“Book Review: ‘The Bounty Effect’ and ‘Corrupted Culture’” by James Srodes in The Washington Times. 
CNBC Interview with Evan Rosen by Donny Deutsch. "Collaboration Now" primetime special. 
Collaborata Blog. “How Collaborative Culture is Changing Business,” June 2, 2016.
Boston Scientific Co-Founder John Abele’s Kingbridge Collaboration Blog. “Are You a Knowledge Worker?”
"Skills Sharpener: Collaboration" by Julie Wilson, Phoenix Focus, June 6, 2016
Ryan, JoAnn (July 21, 2017). “From the Chamber: Collaboration is Critical,” The Register Citizen.
Communication World. “The Keys to a Collaborative Culture.” Review of The Culture of Collaboration by Kim A. Hanson.
IndustryWeek. “Collaborative Manufacturing Creates Value.”
Review of The Culture of Collaboration by James Srodes in The Washington Times
Interview with Evan Rosen in Ernst & Young Performance magazine
Forbes Interview with Evan Rosen by Bennett Voyles, “Alternatives to the Annual Performance Review” March 16, 2016.
The Bounty Effect (2013)  
The Culture of Collaboration(2007) 
Personal Videoconferencing (1996) 
http://www.thecultureofcollaboration.com/
Bloomberg Businessweek Columnist Biography: Evan Rosen
Axiom Business Book Awards Review of The Culture of Collaboration 

Living people
American male journalists
University of Michigan College of Literature, Science, and the Arts alumni
American television reporters and correspondents
American columnists
Horace Mann School alumni
American non-fiction writers
Business speakers
American consultants
Year of birth missing (living people)
American business and financial journalists
American business theorists
American business writers